A Woman Scorned is a 1999 short thriller directed by Treva Etienne and starring Marcia Johnson.

Premise
A woman intends to terrorize the family of a rival businessman of her late husband. She is employed by the family after they advertise for a private tutor for their son. After making sexual advances on him, she then turns her attention to the rest of the household.

References

External links
 

1999 films
American short films
1990s thriller films
1990s English-language films